Royal Hurlburt Weller (July 2, 1881 – March 1, 1929) was a United States representative from New York.

Early life and education

Weller was born in New York City on July 2, 1881. He attended the public schools and the College of the City of New York and graduated from the New York Law School in 1901.

Career

He was admitted to the bar in 1902 and commenced practice in New York City; assistant district attorney of New York County from 1911 to 1917, when he resigned to reenter the practice of law; counsel for the Alien Property Custodian in 1918 and 1919; elected as a Democrat to the Sixty-eighth, Sixty-ninth, and Seventieth Congresses and served from March 4, 1923, until his death; had been reelected to the Seventy-first Congress; He died in New York City, interment in Woodlawn Cemetery.

The Library of Congress has cataloged a bill with which Weller was connected: A bill to establish a national conservatory of music for the education of pupils in music in all its branches. [Washington: Govt. Printing Office, 1927.

See also 
 List of United States Congress members who died in office (1900–49)

External links
 

1881 births
1929 deaths
New York Law School alumni
Burials at Woodlawn Cemetery (Bronx, New York)
Democratic Party members of the United States House of Representatives from New York (state)
20th-century American politicians